The men's team épée was one of eight fencing events on the fencing at the 1960 Summer Olympics programme. It was the eleventh appearance of the event. The competition was held on 9 September 1960. 105 fencers from 21 nations competed.

Competition format 
The competition combined pool play with knockout rounds, a change from prior tournaments which used pool play all the way through. The first round consisted of pools, with the 21 teams entered in the competition divided into 7 pools of 3 teams. The top 2 teams in each pool after a round-robin advanced. The 14 teams remaining after the pool play competed in a four-round single-elimination bracket, with a bronze medal match between the semifinal losers. The winners of the first 2 pools received byes in the round of 16.

Each team match consisted of each of the four fencers on one team facing each fencer on the other team, for a maximum of 16 total bouts. An 8–8 tie would be resolved by touches received in victories. Bouts were to 5 touches (except that bouts would continue until there was a winner and would not end on a double-touch). Only as much fencing was done as was necessary to determine pool placement (in the first round) or the winning team (in the knockout rounds), so not all matches went to the full 16 bouts but instead stopped early (typically when one team had 9 bouts won).

Rosters

Australia
 Ivan Lund
 Richard Stone
 John Humphreys
 John Simpson
 Keith Hackshall

Belgium
 Pierre Francisse
 René Van Den Driessche
 Jacques Debeur
 Roger Achten
 François Dehez

Finland
 Kaj Czarnecki
 Kurt Lindeman
 Rolf Wiik
 Kalevi Pakarinen

France
 Armand Mouyal
 Yves Dreyfus
 Claude Brodin
 Christian d'Oriola
 Jack Guittet
 Gérard Lefranc

Germany
 Paul Gnaier
 Fritz Zimmermann
 Dieter Fänger
 Georg Neuber
 Helmut Anschütz
 Walter Köstner

Great Britain
 Allan Jay
 Michael Howard
 John Pelling
 Bill Hoskyns
 Raymond Harrison
 Michael Alexander

Hungary
 József Marosi
 Tamás Gábor
 István Kausz
 József Sákovics
 Árpád Bárány

Ireland
 George Carpenter
 Christopher Bland
 Brian Hamilton
 Tom Kearney

Italy
 Edoardo Mangiarotti
 Giuseppe Delfino
 Carlo Pavesi
 Alberto Pellegrino
 Fiorenzo Marini
 Gianluigi Saccaro

Japan
 Heizaburo Okawa
 Tsugeo Ozawa
 Sonosuke Fujimaki
 Kazuhiko Tabuchi

Lebanon
 Ibrahim Osman
 Mohamed Ramadan
 Michel Saykali
 Hassan El-Said

Luxembourg
 Roger Theisen
 Edy Schmit
 Robert Schiel
 Rudy Kugeler
 Eddi Gutenkauf

Mexico
 Benito Ramos
 Ángel Roldán
 Antonio Almada
 Sergio Escobedo
 José Pérez

Morocco
 Abbes Harchi
 Abderrahman Sebti
 Charles Ben Itah
 Abderraouf El-Fassy
 Mohamed Ben Joullon

Poland
 Bohdan Gonsior
 Jerzy Strzałka
 Wiesław Glos
 Janusz Kurczab
 Andrzej Kryński

Portugal
 José Ferreira
 Manuel Borrego
 José Fernandes
 José de Albuquerque

Soviet Union
 Guram Kostava
 Bruno Habārovs
 Arnold Chernushevich
 Valentin Chernikov
 Aleksandr Pavlovsky

Spain
 Pedro Cabrera
 Manuel Martínez
 Jesús Díez
 Joaquín Moya

Sweden
 Hans Lagerwall
 Göran Abrahamsson
 Ulf Ling-Vannérus
 Berndt-Otto Rehbinder
 Carl-Wilhelm Engdahl
 Orvar Lindwall

Switzerland
 Hans Bässler
 Jules Amez-Droz
 Paul Meister
 Charles Ribordy
 Claudio Polledri
 Michel Steininger

United States
 James Margolis
 Roland Wommack
 David Micahnik
 Henry Kolowrat Jr.
 Ralph Spinella

Results

Round 1

Pool A 

The United States defeated Portugal, as did Italy. This eliminated Portugal; the United States and Italy faced off to determine their placing within the group. Italy took first in the group with a win over the United States.

Pool B 

Japan and Hungary each defeated Mexico, then faced off for place within the group. Hungary won to take first place and a bye in the round of 16.

Pool C 

Switzerland and the Soviet Union each defeated Lebanon, though in both cases the bouts were tied at 8–8 and touches received (in victories) were necessary to determine the match winner (Switzerland won 23 touches received to 26; the Soviet Union won 18 to 25). Switzerland and the Soviet Union then faced off for place within the group, with the Soviets winning.

Pool D 

Finland and France each defeated Ireland, then faced off for place within the group. France won to take first place.

Pool E

Luxembourg and Great Britain each defeated Morocco, then faced off for place within the group. Great Britain won to take first place (Great Britain's touches-received lead was great enough that the match was stopped at 8–7; even had Luxembourg won the 16th bout, Great Britain would have the tied-breaker).

Pool F

Sweden and Germany each defeated Australia, then faced off for place within the group. Germany won to take first place.

Pool G

Belgium and Poland each defeated Spain, then faced off for place within the group. They tied, 8–8 with 61 touches received each.

Elimination rounds

Final classification

References

Epee team
Men's events at the 1960 Summer Olympics